VPID may refer to:

Computing
 Vendor Product ID, in the SCSI context
 Video Payload Identifier, in the Serial digital interface#VPID (SDI) context
 Virtual Process ID, a process ID (PID) within a Linux PID namespace
 Virtual Processor ID, in the Kernel-based Virtual Machine (KVM) context